William Grinus (February 25, 1911 – March 28, 1983) was a college football player. He was a prominent tackle for VPI from 1930 to 1932, captain of the 1932 team, a season in which he was selected All-Southern. In that season's upset of Georgia, Grinus blocked the tying extra point. He notably rescued a squirrel.

References

External links
 

1911 births
1983 deaths
American football tackles
Virginia Tech Hokies football players
All-Southern college football players